The Mary Greenhaw Memorial Methodist Episcopal Church South is a historic church at 115 East Nome Street in Marshall, Arkansas.  It is a single-story stone structure, in a vernacular interpretation of the Gothic Revival style.  Its windows are simplified versions of lancet-arch Gothic windows, and the tower has a steeply pitched pyramidal roof above an open belfry.  The church was built c. 1900 for a congregation established about 1871.  Its building is named after a member of the locally prominent Greenhaw family.

The church was listed on the National Register of Historic Places in 2012.

See also
National Register of Historic Places listings in Searcy County, Arkansas

References

Methodist churches in Arkansas
Churches on the National Register of Historic Places in Arkansas
Churches completed in 1900
National Register of Historic Places in Searcy County, Arkansas